Edwin Flye (March 4, 1817 – July 12, 1886) was an American politician, merchant, banker, bank president, and shipbuilder from Maine.

Early life
Born in Newcastle, Massachusetts (now in Maine), Flye attended the common schools and Lincoln Academy.

Career 
Flye engaged in mercantile pursuits and shipbuilding. He was a member of the Maine House of Representatives in 1858 and served as president of the First National Bank of Damariscotta, Maine, for many years.

During the Civil War, Flye served as a paymaster with the rank of major in the Union Army. He was a delegate to the Republican National Convention in 1876 and was elected as a Republican to the United States House of Representatives to fill a vacancy the same year. He served until 1877. He was not a candidate for renomination in 1876 and instead resumed shipbuilding and banking.

Personal life 
Flye died while visiting the home of his daughter in Ashland, Kentucky, on July 12, 1886. He was interred in Congregational Cemetery in Newcastle, Maine.

External links

 Retrieved on 2008-10-10

1817 births
1886 deaths
People from Damariscotta, Maine
Republican Party members of the Maine House of Representatives
American shipbuilders
Union Army officers
United States Army paymasters
Republican Party members of the United States House of Representatives from Maine
People from Newcastle, Maine
19th-century American politicians
Lincoln Academy (Maine) alumni